The English musician Thom Yorke has released three studio albums, one soundtrack album, three EPs, one remix album and 16 singles. The frontman of the alternative rock band Radiohead since 1985, Yorke's first singles as a solo artist were as a featured vocalist on the singles "El President" by Drugstore (which reached the top 20 in the UK) and "Rabbit in Your Headlights" by Unkle. 

In 2006, Yorke released his debut solo album The Eraser, an exploration of electronica. The album was released by XL Recordings, peaking at number three on the UK Albums Chart and number two on the Billboard 200, and included Yorke's highest-charting single, "Harrowdown Hill". A B-sides compilation, Spitting Feathers, was released in 2006, followed by a remix album, The Eraser Rmxs, in 2008.

After releasing the double A-side single "FeelingPulledApartByHorses/TheHollowEarth" and collaborations with the singer Björk and the electronic duo Modeselektor, Yorke self-released his second solo album Tomorrow's Modern Boxes through BitTorrent in 2014, featuring electronic beats and textured synthesisers. In 2018, he composed the score for horror film Suspiria, comprising both instrumental pieces of score and songs. Anima, his third solo album, was released in June 2019. He has also contributed songs to the soundtracks for The Twilight Saga: New Moon, Motherless Brooklyn, and Peaky Blinders.

Albums

Studio albums

Soundtrack albums

Remix albums

Extended plays

Singles

As lead artist

As featured artist

Promotional singles

Other
 "All for the Best" on Ciao My Shining Star: The Songs of Mark Mulcahy, a Mark Mulcahy tribute album made in June 2009.

Notes

References

See also
 Radiohead discography

Rock music discographies
Discographies of British artists
Discography